In mathematics, the category of compactly generated weak Hausdorff spaces CGWH is one of typically used categories in algebraic topology as a substitute for the category of topological spaces, as the latter lacks some of the pleasant properties one would desire. There is also such a category for based spaces, defined by requiring maps to preserve the base points.

The articles compactly generated space and weak Hausdorff space define the respective topological properties. For the historical motivation behind these conditions on spaces, see Compactly generated space#Motivation. This article focuses on the properties of the category.

Properties 
CGWH has the following properties:
It is complete and cocomplete.
The forgetful functor to the sets preserves small limits.
It contains all the locally compact Hausdorff spaces  and all the CW complexes.

that is natural in X, Y, Z. In short, the category is Cartesian closed in an enriched sense.
A finite product of CW complexes is a CW complex.
If X, Y are based spaces, then the smash product of them exists. The (based) mapping space  from X to Y consists of all base-point-preserving maps from X to Y and is a closed subspace of the mapping space between the underlying unbased spaces. It is a based space with the base point the unique constant map. For based spaces X, Y, Z, there is a homeomorphism

that is natural in X, Y, Z.

Notes

References

Further reading 
 The CGWH category, Dongryul Kim 2017

Algebraic topology
Categories in category theory